is a Japanese manga series written and illustrated by Hotondoshindeiru. It started serialization on Kadokawa Shoten's ComicWalker in June 2018. As of September 2022, eight volumes have been released. The manga is licensed in North America by Yen Press. An anime television series adaptation produced by AtelierPontdarc aired from July 2022 to March 2023.

Premise
In modern-day Japan, Takafumi Takaoka picks up his uncle who recently awakened from a 17-year coma after being hit by a truck. Uncle shows the ability to use magic spells, and explains that he was actually sent to another world. Takafumi lets his uncle move in with him, and he, joined by Takafumi's childhood friend Sumika Fujimiya, spends his days helping Uncle adjust to modern society while also watching his memories of the other world.

Characters
  / 
  / Akira Ishida (Chain Chronicle 3)
 A 34-year-old man who woke up from coma after 17 years, but actually went to another world during that time. His unattractive appearance barely changed since the time he transferred to another world, and he was frequently mistaken for an orc and treated extremely poorly by the inhabitants of the other world, to the point where he had to continuously wipe his own memories to maintain his sanity. He retained his magic ability and uses it freely. He is oblivious of any romantic approach from the girls he encountered during his journey, but instantly realized Sumika's feelings towards Takafumi. Due to his long absence, he tends to be confused by modern-day technology and culture. A diehard SEGA fan, he uses the strategy learned in classic games from consoles like the Sega Genesis and Sega Saturn to inform his tactics in the other world; the decline of SEGA home consoles, which ended with the release of Sega Dreamcast, shocked him to his core.
 
 
 Yōsuke's nephew who took him in after realizing he could make money off his uncle's magic ability, mainly through YouTube ad revenue. He is interested in Yōsuke's adventure in the other world, especially about the girls he encountered through his journey, but his uncle's aromantic personality sometimes turn him off. Ironically, he is also oblivious to Sumika's feelings for him. His parents divorced from the stress of dealing with his uncle's medical status, and he uses Yōsuke's stories as a form of escapism from being raised in a broken family.
 
 
 Takafumi's childhood friend with whom he reunited with after a long time. She has a crush on him, though he remains oblivious. After finding out about Yōsuke's magic ability the moment she came into Takafumi's apartment, she starts spending her days at Takafumi's apartment and together, they spend their days watching replays of Yōsuke's adventures in the other world. While she has fond memories of their childhood, for some time Sumika frequently bullied Takafumi. Though he seems to hold no grudge in the present day, Sumika is horrified at this revelation.
  / 
  / Ayane Sakura (Chain Chronicle 3)
 An elf who Yōsuke rescued in the other world. She has a crush on him after he saved her from a dragon, but since the term 'tsundere' only became popular four years after Yōsuke went into coma, he does not understand her tendencies and thinks she is harassing him instead. Despite this, she is kind, often defending Yōsuke when other people attempt to slander him, though he interprets this as blackmail. It is later revealed that she is the princess of the elves.
 
  / Asami Imai (Chain Chronicle 3)
 A blue-haired, reclusive woman who is the holder of the mythical Ice Sword capable of defeating the Flame Dragon. However, Yōsuke defeats the dragon without using the sword, causing Mabel to question her purpose. She becomes a NEET after Yōsuke encourages her to continue embracing her inner desires. It is later revealed that her ancestors, the Ice Clan, are descendants of a Japanese samurai who was transported to their world 400 years ago.
 
  / Aya Uchida (Chain Chronicle 3)
 A rookie priestess in a party with Edgar and Raiga. Yōsuke repeatedly runs into her party and assists them in completing difficult quests. She is worshipped as a crusader hero after her party accidentally took Yōsuke's credit for defeating a horde of orcs.
 
 
 A rookie swordsman in a party with Alicia and Raiga.
 
 
 A rookie berserker in a party with Alicia and Edgar.
 
 
 Sumika's high school and college friend.

Media

Manga
The series is written and illustrated by Hotondoshindeiru. It started serialization on Kadokawa Shoten's manga app and website ComicWalker on June 29, 2018. A character popularity poll was held to commemorate the release of the first volume, where the winning character would be featured in a bonus segment at the end of the volume. As of September 2022, eight tankōbon volumes have been published.

In November 2020, Yen Press announced that they licensed the series for English publication.

Volume list

Anime
An anime television series adaptation was announced on June 18, 2021. The series is produced by AtelierPontdarc and directed by Shigeki Kawai, with Kenta Ihara writing the series' scripts, Kazuhiro Oota designing the characters, and Kenichiro Suehiro composing the music. It aired from July 6, 2022, to March 8, 2023, on AT-X. The opening theme song is "story" by Mayu Maeshima, while the ending theme song is "Ichibanboshi Sonority" by Yuka Iguchi. The series is currently being streamed worldwide by Netflix. On July 27, it was announced that Episode 5 would be delayed for two weeks to August 17, due to the COVID-19 pandemic. On September 2, following the release of Episode 7, an indefinite delay was put into effect, citing more COVID-19 related concerns. However, on August 27, Ippei Icchi stated that he was supposed to direct Episode 10, but abruptly left following the discovery that the episode still did not have staff chosen, and that only in-house staff would participate. On September 9, it was announced that the series would restart its broadcast from Episode 1 on October 6, with Episode 8, the first new episode since going on hiatus, airing on November 24. On December 26, it was announced that Episode 13 would be delayed and aired at a later date, which was later confirmed to be March 8, 2023.

Episode list

Reception
By June 2022, the manga had 1.8 million copies in circulation; by November 2022, it had over 3.3 million copies in circulation.

The series ranked eighth in the 2019 Next Manga Awards in the digital category. The series ranked fifteenth in 2020 a survey of workers of the Honya Club bookstore in Japan. In the 2020 edition of the Kono Manga ga Sugoi! guidebook, the series ranked eleventh. Also in 2020, it was a runner-up for BookWalker's grand prize.

Demelza from Anime UK News had mixed feelings about the first volume and criticized the art and characters.

Notes

References

External links
 Manga official website at ComicWalker 
  
 
 

2022 anime television series debuts
Anime postponed due to the COVID-19 pandemic
Anime productions suspended due to the COVID-19 pandemic
Anime series based on manga
AT-X (TV network) original programming
Comedy anime and manga
Isekai anime and manga
Japanese webcomics
Kadokawa Dwango franchises
Kadokawa Shoten manga
Netflix original anime
Seinen manga
Webcomics in print
Yen Press titles